Saanjh (Dusk) is a 2017 Indian Himachali Language drama film directed and Produced by Ajay K Saklani. The film features Aditi Charak, Vishal Parpagga and Rupeshwari Sharma in the lead roles, while Asif Basra and Taranjit Kaur play supporting roles. This film received best feature film award in Borrego Springs Film Festival 2017 and Award of Merit in Accolade Global Film Competition, November 2016. Saanjh marks the debut of Producer and Director, Ajay K Saklani, who, through this movie attempts to bring to the fore the lesser known Himachali language and tries to revive the almost forgotten Tankri Script. Saanjh is the first feature film to have been made and released in the Western Himalayan/ Pahari language or Western Pahari. Shot in several picturesque locations in and around the Kullu Valley including Shangarh, Parvati Valley, Great Himalayan National Park and Rohtang Pass, Parashar Lake in Mandi and also in Lahaul and Spiti Valley. The movie treats the audience with some of the most mesmerising shots taken from the remotest corners of Himachal Pradesh. The serenity of village life amidst the Himalayas reaches the peak of sublimity as the visual tour is accompanied by some of the most melodious songs rendered by Mohit Chauhan and Pavithra Chari which strike the heart strings of even those who are unfamiliar with the Pahari dialect. The movie provides a perfect audio-visual setting for a beautiful confluence of the emotional journeys of a daughter, a mother and an orphaned boy as the sun sets on their lives and dusk sets in. Saanjh was the first film in Pahari (Himachali) dialect chain of Western Pahari to be released in cinema halls across India.

Plot 
Set in the beautiful Kullu valley in Himachal Pradesh, Saanjh follows the journey of a 16-year-old girl from Chandigarh named Saanjh (Sanju), who becomes the victim of cyber crime. Instead of supporting his daughter, her father sends her away to their ancestral home in a remote village to live with her grandmother. Isolated and dejected, Sanju is unable to cope up with the village life where she encounters an imbecile house guest, Jonga, with whom she has a rough start. As time passes, however, she finds solace in his company and with him hatches a plan to raise just enough money to escape from the village and return to her home in the city. Meanwhile, Sanju gradually begins to understand her grandmother's pain of living a secluded life and they bond over being ostracised by the man who failed to be a good son and father at the same time. When Sanju's grandmother falls sick, the film captures that unforgettable saanjh (dusk) when twilight dissolves into the darkness of loss and despair.

Cast 

 Aditi Charak as Sanju
 Vishal Parpagga as Jonga
 Rupeshwari Sharma as Dadi
 Asif Basra as Shamsher
 Taranjit Kaur as Sanju's Mother

Production 
The production of Saanjh film begun in July 2015 and was completed by November 2016. The film was submitted to various film festivals across the world. Saanjh was officially selected for Borrego Springs Film Festival 2017 where the film won the Best Feature Film Award. The film also bagged Award of Merit in The Accolade Global Film Competition November 2016. Saanjh film was officially selected for Los Angeles International Women's Film Festival 2017 and Cinema on the Bayou Film Festival, Louisiana 2017.

Music 

The film's music was composed by Gaurav Guleria, vocals by Mohit Chauhan, Pavithra Chari and Gaurav Guleria.

References

External links 
 

2017 films
2017 drama films